Ryon is both a surname and a given name. Notable people with the name include:

John Walker Ryon, American politician
Luann Ryon, American archer
Ruth Ryon (1944–2014), American real estate columnist
Ryon Bingham, American football player
Ryon Healy, American baseball player

See also 

 Ronas Ryon, American racehorse